Rorer Abraham James (March 1, 1859 – August 6, 1921) was a lawyer, newspaperman and politician from Virginia.  As a politician, he served in the Virginia House, Senate, and as United States Representative.

Biography
Born near Brosville, Virginia, James was instructed by private tutors.  He attended Roanoke College, before graduating from the Virginia Military Institute at Lexington in 1882 and from the law department of the University of Virginia at Charlottesville in 1887.  James was admitted to the bar in 1887 and commenced legal practice in Danville, Virginia.
He became owner and editor of the Danville Register in 1899 and later purchased the Danville Bee.

Political career
James served as member of the Virginia House of Delegates in the years 1889-1892, and in the Senate of Virginia from 1893 through 1901.

Nearly 20 years after leaving the Virginia Senate, James went as a delegate to the Democratic National Convention of 1920.  He subsequently served as chairman of the fifth district Democratic committee, then as chairman of the Democratic State committee.  In addition to his political appointments, James also acted as head of the Virginia Military Institute board of trustees.

James was elected as a Democrat to the Sixty-sixth Congress, by special election, to fill the vacancy caused by the resignation of U.S. Representative Edward W. Saunders, and reelected to the Sixty-seventh Congress (June 1, 1920 – August 6, 1921).  He died on August 6, 1921, in Danville, Virginia, and was interred in Green Hill Cemetery.

See also
List of United States Congress members who died in office (1900–49)

Sources

External links 
 

1859 births
1921 deaths
Virginia lawyers
Democratic Party members of the Virginia House of Delegates
Democratic Party Virginia state senators
Roanoke College alumni
Virginia Military Institute alumni
University of Virginia School of Law alumni
Politicians from Danville, Virginia
Democratic Party members of the United States House of Representatives from Virginia
20th-century American politicians
19th-century American lawyers
19th-century American newspaper editors
20th-century American newspaper editors
19th-century American politicians